Nectonemertes is a genus of worms belonging to the monotypic family Nectonemertidae.

The genus has almost cosmopolitan distribution.

Species:

Nectonemertes acanthocephala 
Nectonemertes acutilobata 
Nectonemertes japonica 
Nectonemertes major 
Nectonemertes minima 
Nectonemertes mirabilis 
Nectonemertes primitiva 
Nectonemertes tenuis

References

Polystilifera
Nemertea genera